Alessandro Iandoli (born 29 April 1984) is a Swiss former footballer who played as a left back. He also holds Italian nationality.

Career
Born in Basel, Iandoli first played his youth football with Nordstern Basel, but after a few years he moved on to FC Basel. He advanced to Basel's first team during their 2002–03 season. Iandoli played in a four of the teams test matches that season and travelled with the team to the summer training camp in USA. Here he played in all three test games, including the match in Washington, D.C. on 15 June 2002. He scored his first goal for the club in the same game as Basel won 8–2 against Chesapeake Dragons. However he played with Basel's U-21 team that season in the third tier of Swiss football. With their U-21 team he played in 25 games scoring 11 goals.

Iandoli started his professional career at Switzerland for Concordia Basel. He played 139 matches at Swiss Challenge League. In August 2008, he returned to Italy for Pescara. On 6 August, he was loaned to Avellino of Serie B, along with Francesco Dettori. Later he returned to Pescara at Lega Pro Prima Divisione and player 12 matches.

His contract was canceled in mutual consent in July 2009, along with Claudio De Sousa.

References

External links
 

1984 births
Living people
Footballers from Basel
Swiss people of Italian descent
Swiss men's footballers
Italian footballers
Association football midfielders
FC Basel players
FC Concordia Basel players
Delfino Pescara 1936 players
U.S. Avellino 1912 players
K.A.S. Eupen players
Sint-Truidense V.V. players
Újpest FC players
Standard Liège players
Serie B players
Belgian Pro League players
Challenger Pro League players
Nemzeti Bajnokság I players
Italian expatriate footballers
Swiss expatriate footballers
Expatriate footballers in Belgium
Expatriate footballers in Hungary
Swiss expatriate sportspeople in Belgium
Swiss expatriate sportspeople in Hungary
Italian expatriate sportspeople in Belgium
Italian expatriate sportspeople in Hungary